"The Promise You Made" is a song by Cock Robin. Written by Peter Kingsbery, the song  was recorded in 1984 for the group's self-titled debut album. It was released as a single in the USA in November 1985, and in early 1986 in Europe where it became a big hit.

Cock Robin version

Music video
The video opens with an old woman stroking her dog; she then comes upon some passers-by and Peter Kingsbery enters the recording studio. As Kingsbery starts singing, people mill around the entrance to the studio and other members of the band also arrive inside and set up the instruments, with Anna LaCazio joining Kingsbery singing. As a fruit stand is knocked over outside, the last band member goes into the studio. In no time all the instruments are in place. Most of the video is made up of fade-outs, alternating the scenes inside the studio showing the band with images of the members of the public outside the studio entrance. The clip ends with pictures of Kingsbery and Anna LaCazio leaving the studio together.

Track listings
All songs written and composed by Peter Kingsbery.

 7" vinyl single

 12" vinyl single

Chart performance

Weekly charts

Year-end charts

Certifications

Chris Roberts version

In 1997, Chris Roberts recorded a German-language version with his wife, Claudia Roberts, titled "Ich will nicht, daß wir uns verlier'n", following their marriage. A version was also recorded in the original English language, but was never published.

Track listing

Kate Ryan cover version

A cover version of "The Promise You Made", together with a French-language version, "La Promesse", were released as a 2004 single by Belgian singer Kate Ryan. The French lyrics were written by Jo Lemaire.

Track listings
 CD single

 Belgium: Antler-Subway, EMI / AS 9108, AS 9111 (Promo)
 Spain: Vale Music / VLDP 288-6 (Promo)

 Belgium: Antler-Subway, EMI / AS 9112

 Germany: Sushi Tunes / 0010132MIN

 U.S.: Water Music Dance / 302 060 569 2

 12" vinyl single

 Belgium: EMI / 549498 6
 Germany: Sushi Tunes / Sushitunes015 (Promo)

Chart performance

Other versions

In 2008 Julio Iglesias Jr. sang a Spanish-language version of this song with the name: "Promete decir la verdad".

References

1984 songs
1986 singles
2004 singles
Cock Robin (band) songs
Kate Ryan songs
Dutch Top 40 number-one singles
Male–female vocal duets